Ngoko may refer to

 Ngoko River, stream in west-central Africa
 Ngoko, informal speech style of Javanese. See